This is a list of Northern Mariana Islands territorial symbols:

References

symbols